Matches played by the American basketball team Orlando Magic have been broadcast since its founding in 1989. Radio commentaries have been broadcast on the WDBO channel, and matches have been televised on Fox Sports Florida and its predecessors. The teams of commentators include a play-by-play commentator, a color commentator, a courtside reporter, and a studio host.

Television

2020s

2010s

2000s

1990s

Radio

2020s

2010s

2000s

1990s

See also 
 List of current National Basketball Association broadcasters

Orlando Magic
 
Prime Sports
Fox Sports Networks
Bally Sports
broadcasters